OGLE-TR-10 is a distant, magnitude 16 star in the constellation of Sagittarius. It is located near the Galactic Center. 
This star is listed as an eclipsing type variable star with the eclipse due to the passage of the planet as noted in the discovery papers.

Planetary system
This star is home to OGLE-TR-10b, a transiting planet found by the Optical Gravitational Lensing Experiment (OGLE) survey in 2002.

See also
 Optical Gravitational Lensing Experiment or OGLE
 List of extrasolar planets

References

External links
 

Planetary transit variables
Sagittarius (constellation)
G-type main-sequence stars
Planetary systems with one confirmed planet
Sagittarii, V5125